North Main Street Historic District is a national historic district located at Hannibal, Marion County, Missouri.   The district encompasses 27 contributing buildings in the central business district of Hannibal. It developed between about 1852 and 1935, and includes representative examples of Italianate and Beaux Arts architecture. Notable buildings include the Lone Building (1853), Brown's Drug Store (1858), Old Central Hotel (1868-1874), Old Schultz Furniture Store (c 1863), Original Farmers and Merchants Bank (1876), Jameson Hawkins Row (1852), Bernice Gano Tavern (c. 1935), and A. W. Lamb Building (c. 1870-1875).

It was listed on the National Register of Historic Places in 1986.

References

[[Category:Historic districts on the National Register of Historic Places in Missouri]
Italianate architecture in Missouri
Beaux-Arts architecture in Missouri]
Buildings and structures in Marion County, Missouri
National Register of Historic Places in Marion County, Missouri